is a Japanese politician of the Liberal Democratic Party, a member of the House of Representatives in the Diet (national legislature). A native of Tokyo he attended the University of Tokyo and law school at Georgetown University in the United States. He was elected to the House of Representatives for the first time in 2005.

References

External links 
 Official website in Japanese.

Members of the House of Representatives (Japan)
Koizumi Children
New York (state) lawyers
Georgetown University Law Center alumni
University of Tokyo alumni
Politicians from Tokyo
1971 births
Living people
Liberal Democratic Party (Japan) politicians